Eugene Rock (November 4, 1921 – October 31, 2002) was an American professional basketball player who played in the Professional Basketball League of America (PBLA) and the Basketball Association of America (BAA) during the 1947–48 season. A native of Huntington Park, California, Rock attended Huntington Park High School before enrolling at the University of Southern California to play basketball. While at USC, Rock earned varsity letters in 1942, 1943 and 1947. Like many male college athletes during his day, Rock served in the military for two years before finishing college; he attained the rank of Captain in the Marine Corps. Rock led the Trojans in scoring during 1942–43 (12.6 points per game) and again in 1946–47 (11.1 ppg). During the former season, USC finished with a then-school record 23–5 mark en route to winning the Pacific Coast League Southern Division title. Rock was also a teammate of future College Basketball Hall of Fame coaches Alex Hannum and Tex Winter.

After his college career ended, Rock played for the Birmingham Skyhawks in the PBLA, which was a professional basketball league that lasted for less than one full season due to underfunding. He averaged 6.9 points per game in seven games before the league folded. Rock then signed with the Chicago Stags of the BAA. In 11 games played, he averaged 0.9 points. His basketball career ended after the season, and Rock worked for the Los Angeles Police Department where he became a captain. Rock retired in 1979 and lived the rest of his life in the San Diego area. On October 31, 2002, he succumbed to cancer.

BAA career statistics

Regular season

Playoffs

See also
List of shortest players in National Basketball Association history

References

1921 births
2002 deaths
All-American college men's basketball players
American men's basketball players
Basketball players from San Diego
Chicago Stags players
Deaths from cancer in California
Guards (basketball)
Los Angeles Police Department officers
Professional Basketball League of America players
Sportspeople from Huntington Beach, California
United States Marines
Undrafted National Basketball Association players
United States Marine Corps personnel of World War II
USC Trojans men's basketball players